Glenmore Station (GLM) is a class III railway station located in Sepanjang, Glenmore, Banyuwangi Regency. This station is included in the Jember IX Operational Area at an altitude of +342 m. This station only has two railway tracks with track 2 being a straight line. This station is in the center of Glenmore district so it is quite busy even though it is far from the provincial highway. As a class III station, this station only serves economy class passenger trains.

The station's main building, which is a legacy of Staatsspoorwegen, is now designated as a cultural heritage by the Center for Conservation and Architectural Design Unit of Kereta Api Indonesia.

Services 
The following is a list of train services at the Glenmore Station.

Passenger services
Economy class
Sri Tanjung, towards  via –– and towards 
Tawang Alun, towards  and towards 
Probowangi, towards  and towards 
Pandanwangi, towards  and towards

References

External links
 

Banyuwangi Regency
Railway stations in East Java
Railway stations opened in 1903